Martha Valdés (1 January 1928 – 20 November 2014) was a Mexican actress. She is known for her work in several films during the Golden Age of Mexican cinema in the 1950s before disappearing from the scene at the end of the decade, such as Espaldas mojadas (1955), Cómicos de la legua (1957), Música de siempre (1958), and Vagabundo y millonario (1959).

Filmography

References

Bibliography
Ayala Blanco, Jorge. Aventura del cine mexicano. Ediciones Era, 1968.
Sánchez, Francisco. Crónica antisolemne del cine mexicano. Universidad Veracruzana, 1989.
García Riera, Emilio. Historia documental del cine mexicano: 1955. Ediciones Era, 1969.
Amador, María Luisa. Cartelera cinematográfica, 1950–1959. UNAM, 1985.
García Riera, Emilio. Historia documental del cine mexicano: 1958. Ediciones Era, 1975.

External links

1928 births
2014 deaths
Mexican film actresses
20th-century Mexican actresses
People from Tijuana